Arapov's sign (contracture) is a pain reflex contraction of the right hip joint in appendicitis.

References

Medical signs